Fousseret is a French surname. Notable people with the surname include:

Alain Fousseret (born 1956), French politician
Jean-Louis Fousseret (born 1946), French politician, brother of Alain

See also
Le Fousseret, a commune of Haute-Garonne, France

French-language surnames